Citroen or Citroën is a surname. It may refer to:

André Citroën (1878–1935), French industrialist and automotive designer, manufacturer, and pioneer
Cosman Citroen (1881–1935), Dutch architect
Paul Citroen (1896–1983), German-born Dutch artist and educator

See also
Citroën, French automobile manufacturing company founded by André Citroën
Citron (surname), a similarly spelled surname